Luke McCullough (born 15 February 1994) is a Northern Irish footballer who plays as a centre-back and defensive midfielder for Glentoran.

Club career
McCullough started his career with his local team, Loughgall Youth, before joining Dungannon Swifts where he played in the first team in the IFA Premiership at the age of 15.

Manchester United
He moved to England to play for Manchester United in July 2010. He captained the Academy side throughout the 2011–12 campaign, making 25 appearances. On 25 January 2013, he joined Football League Two side Cheltenham Town on a one-month loan deal. He made his league debut on 16 February 2013, in a 1–1 draw with Aldershot Town, coming on as a substitute for Steve Elliott.

Doncaster Rovers
After spending time on trial during pre-season, McCullough signed a two-year deal with Doncaster Rovers on 25 July 2013. He made his debut for Doncaster when he started in Rovers' 3–1 defeat to Brighton & Hove Albion in the Championship on 2 November 2013.

On 23 July 2016, McCullough signed a new three-year contract. However, less than a month later, on 2 August 2016, it was announced that McCullough would miss the entire season with a cruciate ligament injury.

He was released by Doncaster at the end of the 2018–19 season after spending much of it on loan at Tranmere Rovers.

Tranmere Rovers

McCullough re-signed for Tranmere on no-contract terms on 6 January 2020. The deal was made permanent 24 days later.

Glentoran

McCullough returned to his native Northern Ireland on 1 August 2020, by signing for East Belfast side, Glentoran.

International career
McCullough first represented Northern Ireland at under-16 level where he became captain. He was also captain of the under-17s. Although named in the squad twice before, his first appearance for the under-19s was a start in the 8–1 victory away to Moldova on 15 October 2012. Although he didn't score in that game, he was credited with two assists.

On the same day he signed a contract with Doncaster Rovers, he also received a call-up to play for the under-21 squad in the Milk Cup.

McCullough senior debut came in a friendly loss against Uruguay. McCullough has since become a regular feature of the Northern Irish squad, going to Euro 2016. He did not make an appearance at the tournament.

Personal life
McCullough is a Liverpool fan. His father, Dean McCullough, was also a footballer who played for Glenavon and Portadown.

Career statistics

Club

International

References

External links
 
 
 Northern Ireland profile at Irish FA

1994 births
Living people
Association footballers from Northern Ireland
People from Portadown
Association football central defenders
Association football midfielders
Manchester United F.C. players
Cheltenham Town F.C. players
Doncaster Rovers F.C. players
Tranmere Rovers F.C. players
NIFL Premiership players
English Football League players
Northern Ireland youth international footballers
Northern Ireland under-21 international footballers
Northern Ireland international footballers
UEFA Euro 2016 players
Glentoran F.C. players
Dungannon Swifts F.C. players